Pristimantis calcarulatus is a species of frog in the family Strabomantidae.
It is found in Colombia and Ecuador.
Its natural habitats are tropical moist montane forests and rivers.
It is threatened by habitat loss.

References

Sources
 Castro, F., Ron, S., Coloma, L.A., Yánez-Muñoz, M. & Cisneros-Heredia, D. 2004.  Eleutherodactylus calcarulatus.   2006 IUCN Red List of Threatened Species.   Downloaded on 22 July 2007.

calcarulatus
Amphibians of the Andes
Amphibians of Colombia
Amphibians of Ecuador
Amphibians described in 1976
Taxonomy articles created by Polbot